India competed at the 2004 Summer Paralympics in Athens, Greece. The team included twelve athletes—eleven men and one woman. Indian competitors won two medals at the Games, one gold and one bronze, to finish joint 53rd in the medal table.

Medalists

Sports

Athletics

Men's field

Women's field

Powerlifting

See also
India at the Paralympics
India at the 2004 Summer Olympics

References 

Nations at the 2004 Summer Paralympics
2004
Paralympics